Kodandaramaswamy Temple is a Hindu temple in the town of Ariyalur in Tamil Nadu, India. The presiding deity is Vishnu. However, there is a shrine with the idols of Rama, Sita and Lakshmana. The temple was constructed by a Palubettaraiyar chieftain of Ariyalur. Its oldest records date to the 17th century AD.

References 

 

Hindu temples in Ariyalur district